Jonathan "JJ" Johnson (born Jonathan Edward Johnson III) is an American business executive, currently serving as the CEO for Overstock.com. He was a candidate for the Republican nomination in the 2016 Utah gubernatorial election.

Personal life and education
Johnson was born in Los Angeles, California to Jonathan E. Johnson II and Clare Hardy Johnson, the oldest of their eight sons. He received a Bachelor's degree in Japanese from Brigham Young University in 1990, followed by a Juris Doctor degree from the Brigham Young University J. Reuben Clark Law School, in 1993.

Johnson has been married to his wife, Courtney Johnson, for 27 years and together they have five sons.  His oldest is named Jonathan Johnson IV.

Career
Following his graduation, Johnson worked as a clerk for Utah Supreme Court Justice Leonard H. Russon.

In 1999, Johnson moved back to Utah to work for the publicly traded software company TenFold Corporation, lasting there until 2002 when he was hired by Overstock.com to be general counsel. He served as the chairman of the board at Overstock until 2019. Upon the departure of Patrick Byrne on August 22, 2019 Johnson became the interim CEO of the company.  One month later on September 23, 2019 Johnson was appointed CEO of Overstock.com.

2016 Campaign for Utah Governor
Johnson, a Republican, formally announced his candidacy for governor on August 15, 2015 at the Republican state GOP convention Jonathan Johnson defeated his opponent in the Utah State Republican Convention, by 11 percentage points, forcing the incumbent, Governor of Utah, Gary Herbert, into a primary election, which was held June 28, 2016.

On April 18, 2016, Johnson announced his selection of Robyn Bagley as his running mate.  Bagley is the founder of a charter school, and was a leader on the losing side in the voucher battle in 2007.

Johnson was defeated in the primary. Governor Gary Herbert is the Republican nominee for Utah governor in the 2016 general election.

Education
Johnson and his running mate, Robyn Bagley, focused on education during their announcement to run together for governor and lieutenant governor, and expressed their intention to put education decisions into the hands of private companies. Both running mates voiced support for vouchers that would allow public funding to go to private schools.

References

External links 
Jonathan E. Johnson's Podcast on Leadership in Business

American chairpersons of corporations
American Mormon missionaries in Japan
Living people
Utah Republicans
Year of birth missing (living people)